Erpobdella is a genus of leeches in the family Erpobdellidae. All members do not feed on blood, but instead are predators of small aquatic invertebrates, which they often swallow whole.

Species
The genus includes species previously classified under the genera Croatobranchus, Mooreobdella, Trocheta and Nephelopsis. These were synonymized into Erpobdella by Sidall (2002) after morphogenetic analysis. There are over 30 currently accepted species:
 Erpobdella adani (Tessler, Siddall, & Oceguera-Figueroa, 2018)
 Erpobdella anoculata (Moore, 1898)
 Erpobdella bhatiai Nesemann, 2007
 Erpobdella borisi Chichocka et al., 2015
 Erpobdella bucera (Moore, 1953)
 Erpobdella bykowski (Gedroyc, 1913)
 Erpobdella concolor Annandale, 1913
 Erpobdella costata Sawyer & Shelley, 1976
 Erpobdella dubia (Moore & Meyer, 1951)
 Erpobdella fervida (Verrill, 1874)
 Erpobdella japonica (Pawlowski, 1952)
 Erpobdella johanssoni (Johansson, 1927)
 Erpobdella krasense (Sket, 1968)
 Erpobdella lahontana Hovingh & Klemm, 2000
 Erpobdella luguensis Liu, 1984
 Erpobdella melanostoma (Sawyer & Shelley, 1976)
 Erpobdella mestrovi (Kerovec, Kučinić & Jalžić, 1999)
 Erpobdella mexicana (Dugès, 1872)
 Erpobdella microstoma (Moore, 1901)
 Erpobdella monostriata (Lindenfeld et Pietruszynski, 1890)
 Erpobdella nigricollis (Brandes, 1900)
 Erpobdella obscura (Verrill, 1872)
 Erpobdella octoculata (Linnaeus, 1758)
 Erpobdella ochoterenai  Caballero, 1932
 Erpobdella parva (Moore, 1912)
 Erpobdella punctata  (Leidy, 1870)
 Erpobdella quaternaria (Moore, 1930)
 Erpobdella subviridis (Dutrochet, 1817)
 Erpobdella testacea (Savigny, 1820)
 Erpobdella tetragon (Sawyer & Shelley, 1976)
 Erpobdella triannulata Moore, 1908
 Erpobdella vilnensis (Liskiewicz, 1925)
 Erpobdella wuttkei Kutschera, 2004

References

Leeches
Annelid genera